Bruno Oberle is a Swiss biologist and environmental scientist. On 13 July 2020 he was appointed Director General of the International Union for Conservation of Nature.

Biography 
Oberle  was born in St. Gallen, Switzerland on 12 October 1955, and grew up in Locarno and Zürich. He took biology and environmental sciences at ETH Zurich and obtained his PhD.

Oberle was Professor at the École Polytechnique Fédérale de Lausanne, Chair of the Green Economy and Resource Governance program at the École Polytechnique Fédérale de Lausanne, and is a former Director of the Swiss Federal Office for the Environment and State Secretary for the Environment. Presently, he is Director General of the International Union for Conservation of Nature.

References

1955 births
Living people
Academic staff of the École Polytechnique Fédérale de Lausanne
Environmental scientists
People associated with the International Union for Conservation of Nature
People from the canton of St. Gallen
Swiss civil servants